Crenicichla jaguarensis is a species of cichlid native to South America. It is found in the upper Paraná River basin, Brazil.

References

Kullander, S.O., 2003. Cichlidae (Cichlids). p. 605-654. In R.E. Reis, S.O. Kullander and C.J. Ferraris, Jr. (eds.) Checklist of the Freshwater Fishes of South and Central America. Porto Alegre: EDIPUCRS, Brasil. 

jaguarensis
Freshwater fish of Brazil
Taxa named by John Diederich Haseman 
Fish described in 1911